Triplemanía IX was the ninth Triplemanía professional wrestling show promoted by AAA. The show took place on May 26, 2001 in Mexico City, Mexico. The Main event featured a Dog collar match Lucha de Apuestas match where the last man remaining in the match would have his hair shaved off. The participants were Pirata Morgan, El Cobarde and Sangre Chicana.

Production

Background
In early 1992 Antonio Peña was working as a booker and storyline writer for Consejo Mundial de Lucha Libre (CMLL), Mexico's largest and the world's oldest wrestling promotion, and was frustrated by CMLL's very conservative approach to lucha libre. He joined forces with a number of younger, very talented wrestlers who felt like CMLL was not giving them the recognition they deserved and decided to split from CMLL to create Asistencia Asesoría y Administración, later known simply as "AAA" or Triple A. After making a deal with the Televisa television network AAA held their first show in April 1992. The following year Peña and AAA held their first Triplemanía event, building it into an annual event that would become AAA's Super Bowl event, similar to the WWE's WrestleMania being the biggest show of the year. The 2001 Triplemanía was the ninth year in a row AAA held a Triplemanía show and the sixteenth overall show under the Triplemanía banner.

Storylines
The Triplemanía IX show featured five professional wrestling matches with different wrestlers involved in pre-existing scripted feuds, plots and storylines. Wrestlers were portrayed as either heels (referred to as rudos in Mexico, those that portray the "bad guys") or faces (técnicos in Mexico, the "good guy" characters) as they followed a series of tension-building events, which culminated in a wrestling match or series of matches.

Results

References

External links
Triplemanía IX at LuchaLibreAAA.com

2001 in professional wrestling
Triplemanía
2001 in Mexico
Events in Mexico City
May 2001 events in Mexico